The Hanseatics is a 1925 German silent film directed by Gerhard Lamprecht and starring Tamara Karsavina, Fritz Alberti and Hermine Sterler.

The film's sets were designed by the art director Otto Moldenhauer.

Cast
 Tamara Karsavina 
 Fritz Alberti 
 Hermine Sterler 
 Aribert Wäscher 
 Eduard Rothauser 
 Frida Richard 
 Renate Brausewetter 
 Werner Pittschau 
 Andreas Bull 
 Rudolf Lettinger 
 Paul Bildt 
 Gustav Rodegg 
 Georg John 
 Maria Forescu
 Hans Merkwitz

References

Bibliography
 Grange, William. Cultural Chronicle of the Weimar Republic. Scarecrow Press, 2008.

External links

1925 films
Films of the Weimar Republic
Films directed by Gerhard Lamprecht
German silent feature films
Films set in Hamburg
National Film films
German black-and-white films